anime and manga are a category of Japanese fictional media centered on idols, a type of entertainer in their teens and early 20s marketed to have a close relationship with their fans and commercialized through merchandise. Beginning in the 1980s, anime was used as a vehicle to promote an up-and-coming idol's singing career, but has since then created various anime media mix projects centering on fictional singers.

Themes

Idol-themed series use a media mix marketing strategy. Initially, idol-themed series were used to promote music activities for the singers starring in them. Due to the popularity of the characters, the marketing projects are centered on promoting the characters' music and merchandise in real life. Idol-themed series are linked to the Odagiri effect for featuring attractive people of the same gender interacting with each other, and they are also compared to sports series for using themes centered on team-building and competitiveness.

History

In Japan, the concept of an "idol" singer first came into prominence after the 1963 film Cherchez l'idole was released in the country, with Japanese audiences becoming fascinated with Sylvie Vartan and praising both her musical talent and youthful appearance. Her popularity led Japanese entertainment companies to address young singers who shared her aesthetic as "idols." During the 1980s, the economic bubble in Japan led to more anime being produced, as well as a rapid growth of idol singers debuting, which led the decade to become known as the "Golden Age of Idols." As television was influential for idols, anime became one of the mediums used to promote their careers. Creamy Mami, the Magic Angel was the first notable anime series to use a "media mix" marketing strategy to launch Takako Ōta's singing career, where she would provide the voice to the main character and portray her at music events. Idol singer Noriko Hidaka played the lead character, Minami Asakura, in Touch.

In the 1990s, public interest in idols declined, but slowly began regaining popularity near the early 2000s. In the 2000s, as more late-night anime was produced, voice actors such as Yukari Tamura, Nana Mizuki, Yui Horie, and Aya Hirano were promoted as idols by their record labels, leading them to be known as "idol voice actors." By this time, character songs performed by the actors were common, one example being Morning Musume member Koharu Kusumi providing the voice to lead character Kirari Tsukishima from Kirarin Revolution and releasing music under her name.

The growing number of idol groups active in the late 2000s and early 2010s led to an era that the media named the "Idol Warring Period." Due to the idol fan culture being connected to anime fan culture, around this time, media properties starring fictional idols also became popular, the earliest ones being The Idolmaster, Love Live!, and Uta no Prince-sama. Some may prefer fictional idols due to them never disbanding, leaving groups, or getting into scandals.

List of idol anime and manga

References

Japanese idols in anime and manga